Ars poetica is a contemporary Israeli poetry group.

The name is at once a riff on Horace's Art of Poetry, and on the term, ars, which means pimp in Arabic, and in Israel Hebrew slang "low-life," a derogatory term for Mizrachi men with connotations of vulgar mannerisms.

The group was started in about 2013 by Israeli poet Adi Keissar. Roy Hasan and Erez Biton are among the more notable members.

References

Hebrew-language literature
Israeli literary movement
Israeli poetry
Poetry organizations
Mizrahi Jewish culture in Israel
2013 establishments in Israel